The United States Navy's sixteen O-class submarines were created out of the lessons learned from the L class. The O class were about 80 tons larger than the L class, with greater power and endurance for ocean patrols. Due to the American entry into World War I the O class were built much more rapidly than previous classes, and were all commissioned in 1918. O-1 through O-10 were group 1, designed by Electric Boat, O-11 through O-16 were group 2, designed by the Lake Torpedo Boat Company and sometimes considered a separate class. The group 2 boats entered service just before the end of World War I. Eight of the group 1 boats survived to serve in World War II as training boats when they were recommissioned in 1941.

The O class were built by five shipyards: O-1 by Portsmouth Navy Yard, Kittery, Maine, O-2 by Puget Sound Navy Yard, Bremerton, Washington, O-3 through O-10 by Fore River Shipyard, Quincy, Massachusetts, O-11 through O-13 by Lake Torpedo Boat Company, Bridgeport, Connecticut, and O-14 through O-16 by California Shipbuilding (formerly Craig Shipbuilding), Long Beach, California.

Service
The class originally operated in the anti-submarine role off the United States's East Coast. The steamer scored six hits on O-4s conning tower and pressure hull before her identity was discovered. O-4 suffered minor damage caused by shell splinters.  to  boats formed part of the twenty-strong submarine force that left Newport, Rhode Island on 2 November 1918 for the Azores, but the task force was recalled after the Armistice was signed nine days later.

The second group of boats (O-11 through O-16), built by the Lake Torpedo Boat Company and Craig Shipbuilding, suffered from electrical problems.  was immediately sent to the Philadelphia Navy Yard for a five-month overhaul. In October 1918,  sank the patrol boat  in a collision while she (O-13) was submerged.  also underwent a refit but was sent into reserve soon after before she went into service at Coco Solo in the Panama Canal Zone. This also involved another overhaul.  also underwent a refit soon after commissioning and later suffered a fire in her conning tower in December 1919. All six of the group 2 boats were decommissioned in July 1924 and were scrapped in July 1930 under the terms of the London Naval Treaty. However,  was disarmed, renamed Nautilus, and used in an Arctic expedition by Sir Hubert Wilkins. After being returned to the US Navy, she was scuttled in a Norwegian fjord in November 1931.

The first group served well although  was rammed by a cargo ship and sunk near the Panama Canal on 28 October 1923 with the loss of three crew members. All nine of the surviving Group 1 boats were decommissioned in 1931, but were recommissioned, except for O-1, in 1941 to serve as training boats based at the Naval Submarine Base New London, Connecticut. Thirty-three of her crew were lost.

At some point between the wars the O-class was modified for improved safety in the event of sinking. Two marker buoys were added fore and aft. In the event the submarine was stranded on the bottom the buoys could be released to show the submarine's position. A motor room hatch was also added, the motor room being the aftermost compartment. The tapered after casing became a step as a result of these modifications.

During World War II, the seven remaining O boats were stationed at the New London Submarine Base and served as training platforms for the Submarine School.  The last O boat, USS O-4, was decommissioned in September 1945.  O-4 had served for 27 years and was, at that time, the longest serving submarine in this history of the US Navy.

At least one O-class submarine can be seen briefly in the 1943 movie Crash Dive, filmed at the New London submarine base.

Ships in class 
The 16 submarines of the O-class were:

Group 1 (Electric Boat design)

Group 2 (Lake Torpedo Boat Company design)

See also
 List of lost United States submarines
 List of United States submarine classes

References

Notes

Sources

 Gardiner, Robert, Conway's All the World's Fighting Ships 1906–1921 Conway Maritime Press, 1985. .
 Friedman, Norman "US Submarines through 1945: An Illustrated Design History", Naval Institute Press, Annapolis:1995, .
 Navsource.org early diesel submarines page
 Pigboats.com O-boats page
 DiGiulian, Tony Navweaps.com 3"/23 caliber gun
 ShipbuildingHistory.com Craig Shipbuilding page

External links

Submarine classes
 
 O class
 O class